Nature Sounds is a record label based in Brooklyn, New York, specializing in hip hop and reggae music. The label is independently owned and operated. It was founded by Devin Horwitz in 2003.

History 
Nature Sounds was founded in 2003 by Devin Horwitz, also known as the producer Dev 1. Since then, the label has featured releases from prominent artists such as Blu, MF DOOM, Pete Rock, R.A. The Rugged Man and Immortal Technique, among others.

Discography

 Ayatollah - Fingertips (2011)
 Ayatollah - Live from the MPC 60 (2010)
 Ayatollah - Cocoon (2010) (digital only)
 Ayatollah - The Quixotic (2010) (digital only)
 Ayatollah - Drum Machine (digital only)
 Ayatollah - Louder
 Ayatollah - Now Playing (2006)
 Big City (Psycho Les, Al Tariq, Problemz) - The City Never Sleeps (2007)
 Blu - HerFavoriteColo(u)r
 Blu - Good to Be Home (2014)
 Black Market Militia  - Black Market Militia
 Chris Lowe - The Black Life (2004)
 Copywrite - Cruise Control Mixtape Vol. 1 (2005)
 DJ Babu - The Beat Tape Vol. 2
 DJ Babu  - Duck Season Vol. 3
 Hell Razah  - Heaven Razah (2010)
 Hell Razah  - Renaissance Child
 Mathematics  - Mathematics Presents Wu-Tang Clan & Friends Unreleased (2007)
 Mathematics - The Problem
 Mathematics - Soul of a Man (2006)
 O.C. & A.G. - Oasis (2010)
 Omega One - The Lo-Fi Chronicles (2005)
 Pete Rock  - NY's Finest
 Scientist  - Dub 9/11
 Strong Arm Steady  - Deep Hearted
 Termanology - Politics as Usual
 Immortal Technique - Revolutionary Vol. 1
 Immortal Technique - Revolutionary Vol. 2 (2003)
 Tragedy Khadafi - Intelligent Hoodlum + Saga of a Hoodlum (reissue) (2007)
 Illmind - Behind the Curtain
 R.A. the Rugged Man - Die, Rugged Man, Die (2004)
 R.A. the Rugged Man - Legendary Classics Volume 1 (2009)
 R.A. the Rugged Man - Legends Never Die (2013)
 Various Artists (Nature Sounds) - Convexed (2003)
 Various Artists (Nature Sounds) - Natural Selection (2006)
 Various Artists (Nature Sounds) - Too Stoned for TV (2005)
 Vordul Mega - The Revolution of Yung Havoks (2004)
 Havoc - The Kush (2007)
 J Dilla - Jay Stay Paid (2009)
 Earl "Chinna" Smith - Dub It! (2004)

MF DOOM
 Special Herbs: The Box Set Vol. 0-9 (2003)
 Special Herbs, Vols. 5 & 6 (2003)
 Best of KMD (2004)
 Live from Planet X (2005)

Masta Killa
 No Said Date (2004)
 Made in Brooklyn (2006)
 Selling My Soul (2012)
 Loyalty Is Royalty'' (2017)

See also
 List of record labels
 Underground hip hop

References

External links
 Official website

American record labels
Hip hop record labels
Reggae record labels
Companies based in New York City